John Lacey is the name of:

John Lacey (artist), American woodcarver
John Lacey (general) (1755–1814), American military officer during the American Revolutionary War
John Lacey (rugby union) (born 1973), Irish rugby union player and referee
John F. Lacey (1841–1913), American politician
 John Hubert Lacey (born 1944), British psychiatrist
John W. Lacey (1848–1936), Chief Justice of Wyoming

See also
John Lacy (disambiguation)